Conus nocturnus is a species of sea snail, a marine gastropod mollusk in the family Conidae, the cone snails and their allies.

Like all species within the genus Conus, these snails are predatory and venomous. They are capable of "stinging" humans, therefore live ones should be handled carefully or not at all.

Description
The size of the shell varies between 45 mm and 86 mm. The pattern of the markings are essentially the same as in Conus marmoreus, but the chocolate-color coalesces into two broad irregular bands within which the triangular white spots appear only occasionally. In Conus deburghiae the surface is sometimes granular in the revolving lines, and the nodules are compressed.

Distribution
This marine species occurs off Madagascar, off Mauritius, Sri Lanka, the Moluccas and New Guinea.

References

 Filmer R.M. (2001). A Catalogue of Nomenclature and Taxonomy in the Living Conidae 1758 - 1998. Backhuys Publishers, Leiden. 388pp.
 Tucker J.K. (2009). Recent cone species database. September 4, 2009 Edition. 
  Petit R.E. (2009) George Brettingham Sowerby, I, II & III: their conchological publications and molluscan taxa. Zootaxa 2189: 1–218
 Lorenz F. & Barbier J.P. (2012) Two new cones from the Philippines (Gastropoda: Conidae). Acta Conchyliorum 11: 3–10. [April 2012]
 Puillandre N., Duda T.F., Meyer C., Olivera B.M. & Bouchet P. (2015). One, four or 100 genera? A new classification of the cone snails. Journal of Molluscan Studies. 81: 1–23

External links
 The Conus Biodiversity website
 
 Cone Shells – Knights of the Sea

nocturnus
Gastropods described in 1786